Sir John Francis Charles de Salis, 7th Count de Salis  (19 July 1864 – 14 January 1939) was an Anglo-Irish British diplomat and landowner

Family background
He was the elder son of Count John Francis William de Salis (1825–1871), a diplomat and numismatist of Hillingdon, and Amelia Frances Harriet (1837 – 8 January 1885), eldest daughter of Christopher Tower, JP DL MP, (1800–84), of Huntsmoor Park, Iver, Buckinghamshire, and of Weald Hall, Essex.

Diplomatic career
After being educated at Eton (1877–1882, Edward Compton Austen Leigh's house) he was nominated an attaché in the diplomatic service on 20 November 1886. He passed a competitive examination on 14 January 1887. On 12 June 1888 he was appointed to Brussels as an attaché and promoted to Third Secretary on 14 January 1889. From 24 April 1892 he served in Madrid, and was promoted to Second Secretary on 22 August 1893. From August 1894 he served in Cairo under Lord Cromer in charge of the agency there when the Dervishes were active (he was granted an allowance for knowledge of Arabic on 2 April 1895). In autumn 1897 he was in Berlin, in 1899 in Brussels and from 1901 in Athens, as head of chancery (dealing with the Macedonian problem). He was promoted to First Secretary on 1 April 1904. He was employed between 1901–06 at the Foreign Office in  London, and appointed a British Delegate for negotiation of a new Commercial Convention with Romania on 7 September 1905. He served as Berlin chargé d'affaires and counsellor of embassy from 1 July 1906 to 1911, and was a British delegate at the International Copyright Conference at Berlin, October–November 1908. From November 1911 to 1916 he served as Envoy Extraordinary and Minister Plenipotentiary to the King of Montenegro at Cettinjé, and was Envoy Extraordinary and Minister Plenipotentiary on a special mission to the Holy See in 1916–1923, (Pope Benedict XV 1916-1922, and same to Pope Pius XI 1922-1923). He was a member of the 1931 Malta Royal Commission (report issued in a blue book, 11 February 1932).

De Salis Report
In 1919 the British Government sent de Salis to investigate the Serbian occupation of Montenegro, but his resulting report was suppressed. Alexander Devine in The Martyred Nation, 1924 wrote: The fact is the Report contains such a damning indictment of Serbian rule that its publication would immediately provoke interference; and that interference did not suit our policy towards the French Government.

In the House of Commons, Ronald McNeill repeatedly asked about production of the Report and De Salis's possible arrest. But as Devine put it: When the day came that Mr. McNeill found himself Under-Secretary for Foreign Affairs in the late Conservative Ministry, the Report was on his desk in the Foreign Office and Mr. McNeill could no more disclose its contents than his predecessors could. Meanwhile, Lord Sydenham in the House of Lords, Hansard, 29 November 1920 said:
The Papers for which I ask are two. The first is the Report of Count de Salis, which the noble Earl (Curzon) the Leader of the House said he had no objection to giving, but he added— If the report is made public, the names of witnesses would be contained in it who gave their evidence to Count de Salis only on the pledge of strictest secrecy, and who might, I think, suffer seriously from divulgation. Could there be a clearer admission of what is going on in Montenegro? 
In a letter, dated New York, 1 May 1922, published in The New York Times, 7 May 1922, Ronald Tree described the Count as:
'..perhaps the greatest English authority on the Balkans'.

In April 1920, months after the possible event, an alleged arrest and imprisonment by the Serbians, the New York Times reported:
Serbs arrest de Salis, Montenegro minister accuses Britain and Wilson to Nicholas.
Paris, 2 April.
"Count de Salis, formerly British Minister to Montenegro and later a special envoy to the Vatican for the British Government, has been arrested and imprisoned by the Serbians while executing a mission of investigation for his Government. This information is contained in a declaration made to King Nicholas of Montenegro, who is now in Paris, by the Montenegran Foreign Minister. Count de Salis's life has been in danger for a long time, according to this declaration, which prefaces the details of the incident by recalling Earl Curzon's declaration in the British House of Lords that the Montenegrans were anxious for a union with Serbia. Instead of demanding reparations, the declaration adds, the British Foreign Office suppressed the report of Count de Salis and continued to support Serbian claims. The declaration alleges the report was to the effect that the Serbian army 'which overran Montenegro after the armistice terrorized the population'. The reign of terror still continues, says the declaration, which, after asserting that whatever Serbian troops appear the occupation is followed by pillage, incendiarism and massacres, gives details. In conclusion the complaint is made in the declaration that 'Europe knows what is happening to Montenegro but remains indifferent,' and that President Wilson, 'the great champion of small nations, persistently turns a deaf ear.'"

The sensitivity of the issue is shown by the fact that only one of his four obituaries in The Times (1939) (19 January 1939, page 17, column D) mentions his Montenegran Report, although not the arrest.

Marriage
He married in 1890 Hélène Marie de Riquet, Comtesse de Caraman-Chimay (18 August 1864 – 31 May 1902), daughter of Marie Eugène Auguste de Riquet, Prince de Caraman-Chimay, son of Joseph de Riquet de Caraman (1808-1886), 17th Prince de Chimay and 1st Prince de Caraman.

References
Citations

Bibliography

 Quadrennial di Fano Saliceorum, volume one, by R. de Salis, London, 2003.
 De Salis Family : English Branch, by Rachel Fane De Salis, Henley-on-Thames, 1934.
 Burke's Irish Family Records, ed. Hugh Montgomery-Massingberd, Burke's Peerage Ltd, London, 1976.
 A genealogical and heraldic History of the Colonial Gentry, by Sir (John) Bernard Burke, CB, LLD, vol. 2, London, 1895/1899 (pages 574-77).
 Burke's Peerage, Foreign Noblemen / Foreign Titles sections: 1851, 1936, 1956, etc.
 Debrett's Peerage, Foreign Titles section, 1920, 1925, etc.
 Der Grafliche Hauser, Band XI [volume 11], Genealogisches Handbuch Des Adels, C. A. Starke Verlag, Limburg an der Lahn, 1983 (pps 331-356).
 Armorial Families, a directory of Coat-Armour, compiled by Arthur Charles Fox-Davies, volume 1, 1929.
 The Foreign Office List and Diplomatic and Consular Year Book for 1928, ed. Godfrey E. P. Hertslet, Harrison & sons, London, 1928. (Page 390).
 The Times, page 14 26 February 1936. "Business Man Found Shot Dead".
 The Times, Obituaries,  16, 17, 18 & 19 January 1937.
 The Guardian, obituary, 16 January 1937.
 New York Times,  4 April 1920 (De Salis arrested by Serbs) and Sunday May 7, 1922 (a letter from Ronald Tree).
 The Plantagenet Roll of the Blood Royal, being a complete table of all the descendants now living of Edward III, King of England, by  the Marquis of Ruvigny and Raineval, Anne of Exeter volume, TC & EC Jack, London, 1907 (page 361).
 Lord Sydenham in the House of Lords, Hansard,  29 November 1920.
 J. F. C. De Salis, Report on German Finances, Cd. 5465-19, 1911 (reported in The Times, 16 March 1911).
 The Martyred Nation, A plea for Montenegro, by Alex. Devine, London, 1924.
Annihilation of a Nation, Walter Littlefield in the New York Times, 16 April 1922.
Tom McNamara in The Lough Gur & District Historical Society Journal, No. 10, 1998, page 19, quoting from The Limerick Leader, 7 June 1893.

External links
Portrait of the Count by Walter Stoneman (1876-1958).
 REQUIESCANT in The Tablet, 21 January 1939, (p. 26).

Salis
Salis
John Francis Charles
Counts de Salis-Soglio and Comtes de Salis-Seewis
19th-century Irish landowners
Salis
Ambassadors of the United Kingdom to the Holy See
Ambassadors of the United Kingdom to Montenegro
Swiss nobility
People from Hillingdon
British Roman Catholics
19th-century Anglo-Irish people
20th-century Anglo-Irish people
Catholic Unionists
English archivists
Converts to Roman Catholicism from Anglicanism
British male sport shooters
Knights Commander of the Order of St Michael and St George
Commanders of the Royal Victorian Order
John Francis
20th-century Irish landowners